Toploader are an English rock band from Eastbourne, East Sussex, formed in 1997, with over two million album sales and several top 20 hits both home and abroad. Their debut album, Onka's Big Moka, sold over one million units and peaked in the top 5 of the UK Albums Chart, where it remained for six months. It earned them four nominations at the 2001 Brit Awards. They are recognised most of all for their cover of King Harvest's US hit "Dancing in the Moonlight" written by Sherman Kelly, which became a global hit for the band. Their second album, Magic Hotel, reached number 3 in the UK Albums Chart. The band reunited in 2009; they continue to tour at various gigs and record music.

Career

Formation and early start (1997–1998) 

Named after a joint-rolling technique, Toploader's live career began playing with Coldplay and Muse in small venues across the UK. They later went on to support the likes of Paul Weller, Noel Gallagher, Tom Jones, Robbie Williams and Simple Minds. On 20 July 2000 they backed Bon Jovi at the original Wembley Stadium, becoming the last British band to play there before it was demolished and redeveloped.

Commercial success (1999–2001) 
By 1998, Toploader were picked up by S2 Records, a subsidiary of Sony Music, and signed a six-album deal. On 7 May 1999, the band made their first live TV performance on TFI Friday, hosted by Chris Evans. Later that same year their debut album, Onka's Big Moka, was released on 11 November and became a huge hit. It was produced by Dave Eringa, a long time collaborator of the Manic Street Preachers. It debuted at number five in the UK Albums Chart, until it settled at number four. "Dancing in the Moonlight" was the top single off the album, eventually reaching number seven in the UK Singles Chart, while "Achilles Heel" managed to get to number eight. They gained four nominations at the Brit Awards, despite never winning any of them. On 24 June 2000, Toploader attended the Glastonbury Festival, as part of the Saturday line-up.

Break-up (2002–2003) 
In 2002, they released a second album, Magic Hotel. It was poorly received by critics and failed to match the success of the first. They struggled with a backlash from the UK music press and their single, "Time of My Life", could only make it into the Top 20. Because of the negative reception and the album not meeting the same success as the first, they were dropped by S2. Not long after that, the band broke up in 2003. Julian Deane retired as a musician and in 2007 he founded Raygun Music, a Brighton based management company, that serves both as a record label and publisher.

Reforming and later work (2009–present) 

Six years later, Toploader reformed and signed a one-album deal with Underdogs Music for their third album, which was released in June 2011. The album's title was Only Human, and the first single from it, "Never Stop Wondering", was released on 14 March 2011. Another single, "A Balance to All Things" (featuring a remix from Ash Howes), followed on 20 June 2011.

The present band line-up contains three of the five original members: Joseph Washbourn, Dan Hipgrave and Rob Green.

On 28 April 2012, they performed at the University of Gloucestershire Student Union Summerball. They also performed at Aberystwyth University's May Ball on 11 May 2012. In May 2012, they played at Lakefest festival. They also played at the Tiree Music Festival in July 2012. During 2012 the band agreed to act as patrons for a UK-based children's charity called 'Time Is Precious'.
In November 2012 they performed a gig in Frome, Somerset with all proceeds going to the charity, which helps ill children and their families.

In 2013, Toploader released a new single "Turn It Around", co-written with Eg White and produced by Andrew Green. The song is included on a four-song EP. In the summer of 2013 they headlined the LeeStock Music Festival in Suffolk and the AmpRocks Festival in Bedfordshire.

On 12 May 2017, Toploader's fourth album, Seeing Stars was released. Under a different music label, Big Lake Music, a sublabel of India Media Group. "Roll with the Punches" was chosen as the lead single. The album was crowdfunded using an online direct-to-fan music platform called PledgeMusic. One year before the album's release, Matt Knight left the band.

Jordan Smith from The Xcerts has occasionally performed live with Toploader, but is not a full time member.

Toploader appeared on Ant & Dec's Saturday Night Takeaway on 18 March 2023.

Members 
Current members
Joseph Washbourn – lead vocals, keyboards, organ, piano, acoustic guitar (1997–2003, 2009–present)
Dan Hipgrave – lead and rhythm guitars, backing vocals (1997–2003, 2009–present)
Rob Green – drums, percussion (1997–2003, 2009–present)

Former members
Matt Knight – bass, backing vocals (1997–2003, 2009–2016)
Julian Deane – rhythm and lead guitars, backing vocals (1997–2003)

Touring and session members
Patrick Greenberg – bass, backing vocals (2016–present)

Discography

Studio albums

Compilation albums

Singles

Awards and nominations 
Brit Awards

|-
| rowspan="5" | 2001 || rowspan="2" | "Dancing in the Moonlight" || British Single of the Year || 
|-
| British Video of the Year || 
|-
| rowspan="3" | Toploader || British Group || 
|-
| British Breakthrough Act ||

References

External links 

 
 

Musical groups from East Sussex
Musical groups from London
English indie rock groups
Post-Britpop groups
Musical groups established in 1997
1997 establishments in England